The Turkish State Theatres ( - DT) is the official directorate of the national theatre companies in Turkey. It is bound to the Ministry of Culture and Tourism and financed by the state to promote performed arts and enhance the public interest they receive. As of 2007, the directorate employs around 2,200 people including more than 700 actors and about the same number of stage technicians.

Venues
The directorate owns more than 52 stages in 19 different cities (Ankara, İstanbul, İzmir, Bursa, Adana, Antalya, Trabzon, Konya, Sivas, Diyarbakır, Van, Erzurum, Gaziantep, Malatya, Elazığ, Samsun, Çorum, Zonguldak and Kahramanmaraş), staging about 120 productions in its venues and reaching an audience of about 1.5 million each theatre season also by organizing tours all around Turkey.

See also
Turkish State Opera and Ballet

References

External links
Official website of the directorate 
A brief history of theatre in Turkey, on the website of Ministry of Culture and Tourism

 
Cultural organizations based in Turkey
Theatrical organizations
National theatres